David Andrew Brydon (born 27 June 1996) is a New Zealand field hockey player, who plays as a defender.

Personal life
David Brydon was born in Christchurch, New Zealand. He currently lives in Auckland, New Zealand.

Career

National teams

Under-21
Brydon debuted for the New Zealand U-21 team in 2016 at the Junior Oceania Cup on the Gold Coast. Later that year he went on to represent the team at the Sultan of Johor Cup in Johor Bahru and the FIH Junior World Cup in Lucknow.

Black Sticks
Following his debut with the junior national team, David Brydon made his senior international debut with the Black Sticks in late 2016, at the Trans–Tasman Trophy in Auckland.

In 2017, Brydon won his first medal with the national team at the Oceania Cup in Sydney, winning a silver medal.

Brydon was also a member of the Black Sticks in the inaugural season of the FIH Pro League.

References

External links
 
 
 
 
 

1996 births
Living people
Male field hockey defenders
Field hockey players from Christchurch
New Zealand male field hockey players
Field hockey players at the 2020 Summer Olympics
Olympic field hockey players of New Zealand
Field hockey players at the 2022 Commonwealth Games